Yukio Okabe (Japanese: 岡部 幸雄, Okabe Yukio, born October 31, 1948) is a Japanese former jockey. He belonged to the Japan Racing Association (JRA) from 1967 to 2005. From January 1995 to July 2007, he held the record for the most wins as a jockey in the Japan Racing Association, with a total of 2,943 wins in 2007.

Early life 
Okabe was born on October 31, 1948, in Gunma Prefecture, Japan. He was born to a family of farmers who also raised horses. Okabe was put on a horse from the time he had not yet developed a full understanding, and by the time he was in elementary school he was able to trot and canter on his own. It was during his time in junior high school that he began to seriously pursue a career as a jockey.

Career 
Okabe began his career as a jockey in the fall of his third year in junior high school. He applied to the jockey training center of Bajikōen, and took the exam with the consent of his father, and passed the exam.

In 1978, he achieved 500 wins and held a commemorative party. Hachiro Kasuga, Kyosen Ōhashi, Tarō Yamada and others attended, and his colleague, Itō, sang Hiroshi Itsuki's "Futari no Tabiji".

During his time as the top jockey of Kantō region, Okabe was strong in long-distance races, winning 7 each of Diamond Stakes (3200m) and Stayers Stakes (3600m) (both are the most wins in race history). He also won the Kikuka Award (3000m) three times and the Tennō Award (3200m) four times in the eight major races, and was called the "long-distance oni".

On January 14, 1995, Okabe had achieved a total of 2,017 wins, the highest number in the history of the Japan Racing Association (JRA).

In 1998, he rode on the Taiki Shuttle and won the French Jacques Le Marois Award, achieving the long-sought international G1 victory outside Japan. For his achievements abroad, he is said to be a pioneer of Japanese jockeys riding outside Japan.

On January 24, 1999, he reached a total of 2,500 wins for the first time in the history of JRA.

See also 

 Japan Racing Association Hall of Fame
 Prix Jacques Le Marois

References 

Japanese jockeys
1948 births
Living people